David Collins may refer to:

Sports
 David Collins (Hampshire cricketer), 18th-century cricketer associated with Hampshire
 David Collins (New Zealand cricketer) (1887–1967), played for Wellington and Cambridge University
 David Collins (Scottish footballer) (1912–?), Scottish footballer
 David Collins (Australian footballer) (born 1946), Australian rules footballer for Essendon
 David Collins (politician) (born 1972), politician and footballer from Kiribati
 David Collins (footballer, born 1971), Irish former footballer
 David Collins (rower) (born 1969), American rower
 David Collins (hurler) (born 1984), Irish hurler

Other
 David Collins (lieutenant governor) (1756–1810), first Lieutenant Governor of Van Diemens Land
 David Collins (educational administrator) (1949–2019), British educator
 David Collins (interior designer) (1955–2013), designer of bars and restaurants in London
 David Collins (judge) (born 1954), Justice of the High Court of New Zealand
 David Collins, former Canadian ambassador to Romania
 David Collins (producer) (born 1967), American film producer
 David Collins, film producer of Cairo Time
 David Collins (Dark Shadows), son of Roger Collins on the television serial Dark Shadows
 David Collins (EastEnders)
 Dave Collins (born 1952), outfielder in Major League Baseball
 Dave Collins (radio personality) (born 1962), British radio DJ
 David Collins (comedian) (born 1969), one half of Australian duo The Umbilical Brothers
 Dave Collins (audio engineer), American mastering engineer
 Dave and Ansell Collins, Jamaican vocal/instrumental duo